The Confederated States of the Rhine, simply known as the Confederation of the Rhine, also known as Napoleonic Germany, was a confederation of German client states established at the behest of Napoleon some months after he defeated Austria and Russia at the Battle of Austerlitz. Its creation brought about the dissolution of the Holy Roman Empire shortly afterward. The Confederation of the Rhine lasted from 1806 to 1813.

The founding members of the confederation were German princes of the Holy Roman Empire. They were later joined by 19 others, altogether ruling a total of over 15 million subjects. This granted a significant strategic advantage to the French Empire on its eastern frontier by providing a buffer between France and the two largest German states, Prussia and Austria (which also controlled substantial non-German lands).

Formation

The  "Protector of the Confederation" was a hereditary office of the Emperor of the French, Napoleon. On 1 August, the members of the confederation formally seceded from the Holy Roman Empire, and on 6 August, following an ultimatum by Napoleon, Francis II declared the Holy Roman Empire dissolved. Francis and his Habsburg dynasty continued as emperors of Austria.

According to the treaty, the confederation was to be run by common constitutional bodies, but the individual states (in particular the larger ones) wanted unlimited sovereignty. Instead of a monarchical head of state, as the Holy Roman Emperor had had, its highest office was held by Karl Theodor von Dalberg, the former Arch Chancellor, who now bore the title of a Prince-Primate of the confederation. As such, he was President of the College of Kings and presided over the Diet of the Confederation, designed to be a parliament-like body although it never actually assembled. The President of the Council of the Princes was the Prince of Nassau-Usingen.

In return for their support of Napoleon, some rulers were given higher statuses: Baden, Hesse, Cleves, and Berg were made into grand duchies, and Württemberg and Bavaria became kingdoms. Several member states were also enlarged with the absorption of the territories of Imperial counts and knights who were mediatized at that time.  They had to pay a very high price for their new status, however.  The Confederation was above all a military alliance; the member states had to maintain substantial armies for mutual defense and supply France with large numbers of military personnel.  As events played out, the members of the confederation found themselves more subordinated to Napoleon than they had been to the Habsburgs when they were within the Holy Roman Empire.

After Prussia lost to France in 1806, Napoleon cajoled most of the secondary states of Germany into the Confederation of the Rhine. Eventually, an additional 23 German states joined the Confederation. It was at its largest in 1808, when it included 36 states—four kingdoms, five grand duchies, 13 duchies, seventeen principalities, and the Free Hansa towns of Hamburg, Lübeck, and Bremen. The west bank of the Rhine and the Principality of Erfurt had been annexed outright by the French Empire. Thus, as either emperor of the French or protector of the Confederation of the Rhine, Napoleon was now the overlord of all of Germany except Austria, Prussia, Danish Holstein, and Swedish Pomerania, plus previously independent Switzerland, which were not included in the Confederation.
 
In 1810 large parts of what is now northwest Germany were quickly annexed to France in order to better monitor the trade embargo with Great Britain, the Continental System.

The Confederation of the Rhine collapsed in 1813, in the aftermath of Napoleon's failed invasion of the Russian Empire. Many of its members changed sides after the Battle of Leipzig, when it became apparent Napoleon would lose the War of the Sixth Coalition.

Types of states within the Confederation

Both French influence and internal autonomy varied greatly throughout the confederations' existence. There was also a great variation between the power and influence of the individual states. There are three basic types:

 The first group formed the "Model States", which were mostly ruled by relatives of Napoleon. These include the Kingdom of Westphalia under Jérôme Bonaparte. The Grand Duchy of Berg was first administered by Joachim Murat before he was appointed King of Naples in 1808, and then by Napoleon himself. The third model state was the Grand Duchy of Frankfurt, which was run by the house of Dalberg until 1813. Because of the collapse of the Napoleonic supremacy, this position could no longer justify its own existence. These new foundations were intended to serve as a model for the remaining Rhine federal states through their legal and social policies, such as the Napoleonic Code.
The second group were the reform states of Bavaria, Württemberg, Baden, and Hesse-Darmstadt. These were not dependent areas but in many ways Napoleon's true allies. Although these states took inspiration from the French model, they also went their own way. The historian Lothar Gall suggested that the rulers of the Confederation of the Rhine were made revolutionaries by Napoleon himself. Opposition to the emperor would have been possible only by renouncing the power that he had given to them. "He had not made satellites which were politically incapable of action and forced to be obedient through use of force, but real allies who followed in his well-understood policy reasons of state."
A third group formed the states that joined after 1806. These included the numerous smaller northern and central German territories, except for Saxony. In these, the internal changes were minimal. The reforms remained significantly limited in these states. However, there were also considerable differences among these states. In Mecklenburg and Saxony, the old structures remained almost unchanged. In the Duchy of Nassau, on the other hand, Minister Ernst Franz Ludwig Marshal von Bieberstein ensured moderate administrative modernization and the introduction of religious tolerance.

Member monarchies
The following table shows the members of the confederation, with their date of joining, as well as the number of troops provided, listed in parentheses.

College of Kings

College of Princes

Aftermath
The allies opposing Napoleon dissolved the Confederation of the Rhine on 4 November 1813. After its demise, the only attempt at political coordination in Germany until the creation on 8 June 1815 of the German Confederation was a body called the Central Administration Council; its President was Heinrich Friedrich Karl Reichsfreiherr vom und zum Stein (1757–1831). It was dissolved on 20 June 1815.

On 30 May 1814 the Treaty of Paris declared the German states independent.

In 1814–1815, the Congress of Vienna redrew the continent's political map. Napoleonic creations such as the huge Kingdom of Westphalia, the Grand Duchy of Berg and the Duchy of Würzburg were abolished; suppressed states, including Hanover, the Brunswick duchies, Hesse-Kassel and Oldenburg, were reinstated. On the other hand, most members of the Confederation of the Rhine located in central and southern Germany survived with minor border changes. They, along with the reinstated states, Prussia, and Austria, formed the German Confederation.

See also
 History of Germany
 League of the Rhine
 List of French possessions and colonies
 List of German monarchs
 West Germany

Notes

Explanatory notes

Citations

External links 
 English translation of the treaty establishing the Confederation of the Rhine
 French version of the treaty establishing the Confederation of the Rhine
 Confederation of the Rhine on Napoleon Guide.com
 Confederation of the Rhine on World Statesmen.org

 
1813 disestablishments in Europe
1800s in Germany
1810s in Germany
States and territories established in 1806
States and territories disestablished in 1813
Client states of the Napoleonic Wars
1806 establishments in Europe